Masud Gharahkhani (born 22 September 1982) is a Norwegian politician who has served as the President of the Storting since 2021, and as an Member of the Storting for Buskerud since 2017 for the Labour Party.

Early life and education

Born in Tehran, Iran, Masud Gharahkhani emigrated to Norway with his family in 1987 and grew up in Skotselv in Øvre Eiker.  His family is originally from Piranshahr, Iran. His father is politician and trade unionist Bijan Gharakhani. After attending Rosthaug senior high school, he enrolled at Gjøvik University College studying radiography, graduating as a radiologic technologist, and has been employed by Blefjell Hospital. He has also been employed as secretary-general for the Buskerud Labour party.

Political career

Gharahkhani was first elected as a deputy representative to the parliament in the 2009 election.  He received a standing ovation at the Labour Party national convention in 2011 for his speech about his journey from Tehran to Drammen. Hoping to be the first mayor in Norway with a non-Western immigrant background, Gharahkani was the Labour party candidate for the mayor of Drammen in the 2011 local election. He eventually lost to popular incumbent Tore Opdal Hansen from the Conservative Party. His campaign was marred by speculation in the press about his marriage to a woman in Iran. Gharahkani however blamed his opponents for attempting to smear him.

Prime minister Jens Stoltenberg has called Gharahkhani "an extraordinary political talent" and "a success story in Norwegian society."

President of the Storting
On 24 November 2021, the Labour Party nominated Gharahkhani to succeed Eva Kristin Hansen following her resignation after a parliamentary housing scandal. He was formally elected the day after in a written vote. He is the first person from an immigrant background to serve as Storting president, and second from an ethnic minority after Jo Benkow.

On 7 December, he ordered an investigation into all MPs welfare benefits. He also demanded quicker results, and expanded the commission's mandate and to have them deliver their findings by next summer. He called it "a right and fair signal to give", and received support from the parliamentary leaders in the Storting.

On 10 December, Gharahkhani proposed a wage freeze to last for one more year for Storting representatives. He expressed that it was right to do so until further. He stated: "I informed the presidency on Thursday about the party's position. Pending the committee that will look at executive salaries in the state in general and the Storting's committee that will review the representatives' schemes, we believe it is right to freeze the current remuneration until further notice".

On 15 December, Gharahkhani presented new rules for how members of the Storting should utilise commuter housing. He said that the rules should now be "crystal clear and not to misunderstand". He further explained: "This means that if you own or rent a home that you utilise daily, within 40 kilometers of Oslo, then you are not entitled to commuter housing".

On 4 January 2022, Gharahkhani went into quarantine after his son had tested positive for COVID-19 and began remote working. He also encouraged people to take a COVID-19 vaccine.

On 20 January, Gharahkhani received Princess Ingrid Alexandra of Norway, showing her around the Storting and meeting with Vice President Svein Harberg, and Maren Grøthe, the youngest Storting representative.

Gharahkhani's proposal from December 2021 about a possible wage freeze for Storting representatives was rejected by a majority of the Storting presidency, consisting of the Centre, Conservative and Progress parties. The parties reasoned it was better for the investigative commission to reach their findings before further action should be taken.

Gharahkhani expressed his support for the Arne campaign, which was inspired by the TV series Lykkeland, to promote gender equality and to call attention to gender inequality in top positions in working life. In an email to NTB, he said: "Even though we have come a long way in Norway, we know that name and gender still affect the opportunities you get in working life. A former radiographer and employee in the health service knows this.  That is why I am happy to participate in and support the Arne campaign. We all have a responsibility to influence within the opportunities and choices we make in our daily lives, and not least what we show through our words and actions". He also said that he had invited the people behind the campaign to an 8 March breakfast and to discuss hate and discrimination against women.

On 18 March, Gharahkhani announced that he has contacted the Ukrainian embassy to request if president Volodymyr Zelenskyy would hold a speech to the Storting. Gharahkhani added that he had already sent a request for a meeting to the speaker of the Ukrainian Parliament. Zelenskyy accepted the invitation on 24 March, and promised to speak to the Storting in the near future. Gharahkhani confirmed this, adding that a time for the speech had yet been determined, and that it was an honour that Zelenskyy had accepted. Zelenskyy's speech was subsequently held on 30 March.

On 3 May, it was revealed that Gharakhani had resigned his parliamentary commuter home five days after becoming president of the Storting. He explained that it was because he wanted to take care of his family and to adjust to his new job. This came to light shortly after the commission for parliamentary commuter home cases had concluded that the distance radius to grant a home should be extended to 50 or 60 kilometres, replacing the already existing 40. If so, Gharakhani would no longer have the right to a commuter home.

Marking 77 years since the Victory in Europe Day on 8 May, Gharakhani and foreign minister Anniken Huitfeldt visited Kyiv, where they met President Volodymyr Zelenskyy. They also visited the Tomb of the Unknown Soldier, where they put down flowers.

On 10 June, Gharahkhani confirmed that the Storting would be flying the Pride flag coinciding with Pride celebrations between 18 and 27 June.

In the aftermath of the 2022 Oslo shooting, Gharakhani laid down flowers at the scene. Regarding the shooting, he said, "It was a hot summer night where people were out enjoying themselves, which was suddenly turned into hell.  Shots, people killed, injured. My thoughts go to those who have lost their loved ones and those who are affected." He also added that hate doesn't have anything to do with ones religion and background, while also calling for respect and unity against hate.

On 16 August, Gharakhani announced that the Storting would be called in for an extraordinary meeting in September to discuss measures for the electricity costs. His statement sounded: "It is unanimous from the presidency.  We have agreed that we will have a meeting in the Storting and will come up with a date in dialogue with the government. The power situation is serious.  It is important to show the best of democracy, and that is that the government and the Storting work together for the best for the citizens and the business world in the situation we are in." He also expressed hope for good cooperation between the government and the Storting. The meeting date was later set for 19 September.

On 20 August, as a response to the stabbing of Salman Rushdie, Gharakhani expressed that he didn't believe the Iranian authorities' statement about the country not being involved in Rushdie's assassination attempt. He also stated that Muslims should tolerate the message in Rushdie's book, The Satanic Verses.

Following the opening of the Storting in October, Gharakhani promised that the royals' thrones wouldn't be mixed up again after the Queen and Crown Prince's thrones had been mixed with each other.

On 24 October, Gharakhani attended a meeting in Zagreb, Croatia with Speaker of the United States House of Representatives Nancy Pelosi in relation to a meeting of leaders/speakers of parliaments form around the world. There he also received an Order of Prince Yaroslav the Wise.

Following the announcement that Iran would be abolishing their morality police, Gharahkhani expressed scepticism to the legitimacy of the action. He added that it would not mark the end of brutality by the regime.

Immigrant relations
In an incident where teachers at an elementary school in Drammen banned its pupils from wearing traditional Christmas costumes at an annual Christmas play, Gharahkhani publicly condemned the school for its actions and reiterated the importance of Norwegian culture and tradition in schools. When asked about his personal experiences, he explained: "I always participated in Christmas activities in school and I would recommend it to my children." Commentators praised him for his openness and tolerance. The head principal of the school later apologized for the affair.

A staunch supporter of immigrant integration, Gharahkhani has stated that immigrant children have to learn to speak Norwegian or risk being taken by Norwegian Child Welfare Services, calling failing to teach children Norwegian "unacceptable parental neglect" as it was an absolute prerequisite for succeeding in the Norwegian society.

Personal life
Gharahkhani married his wife Saloumeh "Sally" Abbasian in a private ceremony in Turkey in 2010. They currently live in the Åssiden neighborhood in Drammen. The couple has a son.

Honours

References

External links
 Official Homepage (Norwegian)
 Drammens Tidende – «Hvem fra Buskerud bør sitte ved Kongens bord?», nyhetsartikkel på dt.no 5. oktober 2009
 Drammens Tidende – «AP på flerkulturell stemmefiske», nyhetsartikkel på dt.no 19. august 2009
 Drammens Tidende – «Slik skal AP farge Drammen rød»

1982 births
Living people
Iranian emigrants to Norway
People from Øvre Eiker
Labour Party (Norway) politicians
Politicians from Drammen
Deputy members of the Storting
Norwegian politicians of Iranian descent
Presidents of the Storting